The 1985 National Challenge Cup was the 71st edition of the USSF's annual open soccer championship. Teams from the North American Soccer League declined to participate.  Greek-American A.C. of San Francisco defeated Kutis SC in the final game. The score was 2–1.

References

External links
 1985 National Challenge Cup – TheCup.us

Cup
U.S. Open Cup